The 2009 Mountain West Conference men's basketball tournament was played at the Thomas & Mack Center in Las Vegas, Nevada from March 11–14, 2009. The tournament was sponsored by Conoco.  The quarterfinal was broadcast live on the MountainWest Sports Network, the semifinal games on CBS College Sports Network, and the championship game on Versus.  All games were available in HD.

Second-seeded Utah, one of three teams that shared the regular season conference title, defeated San Diego State 52–50 to claim the Mountain West Conference tournament championship and the league's automatic berth into the NCAA Tournament.

Of note, this was the first time that UNLV failed to make the championship game of the tournament when they were hosting.  The Rebels did not play in the 2001 tournament due to a postseason ban.

Regular season

Tournament bracket

External links

Tournament
Mountain West Conference men's basketball tournament
Mountain West Conference men's basketball tournament
Mountain West Conference men's basketball tournament